Richelieu-Verchères was a former provincial electoral district in the province of Quebec, Canada.

It was created for the 1939 election from all of Verchères and part of Richelieu electoral districts.  It existed for only that one general election and a 1942 by-election.  It disappeared in the 1944 election and its successor electoral districts were the re-created Richelieu and Verchères.

Members of the Legislative Assembly
 Félix Messier, Liberal (1939–1942)
 Joseph-Willie Robidoux, Liberal (1942–1944)

References

External links
 Election results (National Assembly)
 Election results (Quebecpolitique.com)

Former provincial electoral districts of Quebec